The Cody Shale is a Late Cretaceous geologic formation.  It is mapped in Wyoming, Idaho, and Montana.

The formation is described by W.G. Pierce as follows: upper part is buff, sandy shale and thinly laminated buff sandstone; lower part is dark gray, thin-bedded marine shale.

The formation is divided into many members that vary regionally. Alphabetically:

Ardmore Bentonite Beds (WY)
Belle Fourche Member (MT, WY)
Carlile Member (MT, WY)
Claggett Member (MT, WY)
Eldridge Creek Member (MT)
Gammon Ferruginous Member (MT, WY)
Greenhorn Calcareous Member (MT)
Niobrara Member (MT, WY)
Sage Breaks Member (WY)
Shannon Sandstone Member (MT, WY)
Steele Member (WY)
Sussex Sandstone Member (WY)
Telegraph Creek Member (MT, WY)
Wallace Creek Tongue (WY)

Certain members rise to formation rank in other areas; for example, the Greenhorn is classified as a formation in a number of states, particularly in Colorado and Kansas.

References

Shale formations of the United States
Cretaceous Montana
Cretaceous geology of Wyoming